The Beaufortain Massif (French: Massif du Beaufortain) is a massif of the French Alps that straddles the southeastern departments of Savoie and Haute-Savoie, in the historical region of Savoy.

It is also crossed by the Dorinet and  rivers, in addition to their tributaries, from northeast to southwest, at Beaufort level.

It is surrounded by the Aravis Range, the Bauges Range, the Lauzière massif, the Vanoise massif and the Mont-Blanc massif.

Peaks

See also 
 Beaufortain

References

Further reading 

French Alps